Forty-five is a Big Finish Productions audio drama based on the long-running British science fiction television series Doctor Who.  As the play released at the forty-fifth anniversary of the first episode of Doctor Who, it is made of four one-part stories, by different authors, rather than the usual multi-part serial.  All episodes featured the Seventh Doctor as played by Sylvester McCoy, Ace played by Sophie Aldred and Hex played by Philip Olivier.

Main cast
Sylvester McCoy — The Doctor
Sophie Aldred — Ace
Philip Olivier — Hex

False Gods
by Mark Morris
Thebes, Egypt, 1902. Howard Carter discovers the history of Userhat, servant of the god Amun.

Benedict Cumberbatch — Howard Carter
Lucy Adams — Jane Templeton
Paul Lincoln — Robert Charles
Jon Glover — Creodont
Paul Lincoln — Robot

Order of Simplicity
by Nick Scovell
Mind control experiments are uncovered on a remote planet.

Jon Glover — Dr Verryman
Lucy Adams — Mrs Crisp
Benedict Cumberbatch — Thing 2
Paul Lincoln — Thing 1

Casualties of War
by Mark Michalowski
Hex and Ace's pasts are pried on VE Day in London.

Paul Reynolds — Joey Carlisle
Linda Marlowe — May
Beth Chalmers — Audrey
Beth Chalmers — Miss Merchant
Andrew Dickens — PC Miller

The Word Lord
by Steven Hall
In 2045, in a secret bunker in the Antarctic, the Doctor meets the Word Lord.

Linda Marlowe — Commander Claire Spencer
Paul Reynolds — Nobody No-One
Andrew Dickens — Captain James Hurst
Paul Lincoln — Private Fenton
Beth Chalmers — System

Continuity
Ace's mother was last in the TV story The Curse of Fenric.  Hex's mother was killed by the Forge in Project: Lazarus.
Nobody No-One returns in A Death in the Family. Having regenerated, he is played by Ian Reddington.

External links
Big Finish Productions – Forty Five

2008 audio plays
Seventh Doctor audio plays
Fiction set in 1902
Fiction set in 1945
Fiction set in 2045